Harry Edwards (born November 22, 1942) is an American sociologist and civil rights activist. He completed his Ph.D. at Cornell University and is Professor Emeritus of Sociology at the University of California, Berkeley. Edwards' career has focused on the experiences of African-American athletes.

Career
Edwards' career has focused on the experiences of African-American athletes and he is a strong advocate of black participation in the management of professional sports. He has served as a staff consultant to the San Francisco 49ers football team and to the Golden State Warriors basketball team. He has also been involved in recruiting black talent for front-office positions in Major League Baseball.

Author of The Revolt of the Black Athlete, Edwards was the architect of the Olympic Project for Human Rights, which led to the Black Power Salute protest by two African-American athletes, Tommie Smith and John Carlos, both San José State University athletes, at the 1968 Summer Olympics in Mexico City.  Years earlier, Edwards had been a discus thrower on the San Jose State track team.

The New York Times Magazine wrote that Edwards "has seen himself as one who provokes and incites others to action, a reformer, not a revolutionary. And indeed, no other single figure in sports has done as much to make the country aware that the problems of the larger culture are recapitulated in sports, that the arena is no sanctuary from drugs, racism and corruption."

Edwards told Time magazine that he "wants to serve as a role model—the promising athlete who gave up the possibility of a career in professional sports to become a scholar instead." "We must teach our children to dream with their eyes open," he said. "The chances of your becoming a Jerry Rice or a Magic Johnson are so slim as to be negligible. Black kids must learn to distribute their energies in a way that's going to make them productive, contributing citizens in an increasingly high-technology society."

In 1989, Edwards drew criticism for scheduling a midterm examination for one of his classes on Yom Kippur.

In 2014, the University of Texas at Austin established a lecture forum in Edwards' name, the "Dr. Harry Edwards Lectures on Sport and Society". However, in the 2016, Edwards rescinded all association and affiliation with the lecture forum as a result of the implementation of the State of Texas "campus concealed carry law" at the university.

Edwards is a commentator in 2016 documentary miniseries O.J.: Made in America. He also made a cameo appearance as himself in the 2019 film High Flying Bird.

Publications

In addition to articles and essays in Sports Illustrated and Psychology Today, Edwards has written the following:

 ProQuest Historical Newspapers: The New York Times (1851-2008) 
 "Educating black athletes". Atlantic Monthly, August 1983, 253(2).
 "Black student-athletes: taking responsibility". California Living, 1984; reprinted in Representative American Speeches. W. W. Wilson Co., 1984.
 ProQuest Historical Newspapers: The New York Times (1851-2008)

Notes

References

Further reading

 The Baltimore Sun, November 8, 1987.
 Ebony, October, 1987.
 Newsday, July 24, 1987; November 23, 1989.
 Sport, December, 1987.

External links
 NYTimes article about Edwards' work with MLB
 Biography on Answers.com

 Gale Biography In Context.  Interview.

San Jose State Spartans men's basketball players
San Jose State Spartans men's track and field athletes
Track and field athletes from San Jose, California
Cornell University alumni
University of California, Berkeley College of Letters and Science faculty
American sociologists
African-American social scientists
1942 births
Living people
Fresno City College alumni
San Jose State University faculty 
American men's basketball players
21st-century African-American people
20th-century African-American people